Rock County is a county in the U.S. state of Nebraska. As of the 2010 United States Census, the population was 1,526. Its county seat is Bassett.

In the Nebraska license plate system, Rock County is represented by the prefix 81 (it had the 81st-largest number of vehicles registered in the county when the license plate system was established in 1922).

Geography
The Niobrara River flows eastward along the northern boundary line of Rock County. The terrain is composed of rolling hills oriented east–west. The county's central portion is dotted with small lakes. The land sees comparatively little agricultural use. The ground slopes to the northeast.

Rock County is located in Nebraska's Outback region.

Major highways

  U.S. Highway 20
  U.S. Highway 183
  Nebraska Highway 7
  Nebraska Highway 137

Adjacent counties

 Keya Paha County - north
 Boyd County - northeast
 Holt County - east
 Loup County - south
 Brown County - west

National protected areas
 John and Louise Seier National Wildlife Refuge
 Niobrara National Scenic River (part)
 Twin Lakes Rock County Wildlife Management Area

Demographics

As of the 2000 United States Census, there were 1,756 people, 763 households, and 501 families in the county. The population density was 2 people per square mile (1/km2). There were 935 housing units at an average density of 0.9 per square mile (0.4/km2). The racial makeup of the county was 99.03% White, 0.46% Native American, 0.17% Asian, 0.06% from other races, and 0.28% from two or more races. 0.51% of the population were Hispanic or Latino of any race. 33.1% were of German, 12.7% American, 10.5% Irish and 8.4% English ancestry.

There were 763 households, out of which 26.90% had children under the age of 18 living with them, 57.40% were married couples living together, 6.40% had a female householder with no husband present, and 34.30% were non-families. 31.30% of all households were made up of individuals, and 15.90% had someone living alone who was 65 years of age or older. The average household size was 2.26 and the average family size was 2.84.

The county population contained 23.00% under the age of 18, 6.50% from 18 to 24, 23.60% from 25 to 44, 24.60% from 45 to 64, and 22.30% who were 65 years of age or older. The median age was 44 years. For every 100 females there were 92.30 males. For every 100 females age 18 and over, there were 89.90 males.

The median income for a household in the county was $25,795, and the median income for a family was $29,917. Males had a median income of $24,167 versus $16,490 for females. The per capita income for the county was $14,350. About 17.70% of families and 21.80% of the population were below the poverty line, including 36.30% of those under age 18 and 14.00% of those age 65 or over.

Education
Rock County Public Schools operates the public schools in Rock County.

Communities

City
 Bassett (county seat)

Village
 Newport

Unincorporated communities

 Duff
 Mariaville
 Rose
 Sybrant

Politics
Rock County voters historically have been reliably Republican. In only one national election since 1916 has the county selected the Democratic Party candidate (as of 2020).

See also
 National Register of Historic Places listings in Rock County, Nebraska

References

 
1888 establishments in Nebraska
Populated places established in 1888